1583 Antilochus  is a large Jupiter trojan from the Greek camp, approximately  in diameter. It was discovered on 19 September 1950, by Belgian astronomer Sylvain Arend at Uccle Observatory in Belgium, and later named after the hero Antilochus from Greek mythology. The dark D-type asteroid belongs to the 20 largest Jupiter trojans and has a rotation period of 15.9 hours. It forms an asteroid pair with 3801 Thrasymedes.

Classification and orbit 

Antilochus is a dark Jovian asteroid orbiting in the leading Greek camp at Jupiter's  Lagrangian point, 60° ahead of its orbit in a 1:1 resonance . It is also a non-family asteroid in the Jovian background population.

It orbits the Sun at a distance of 4.9–5.4 AU once every 11 years and 7 months (4,244 days; semi-major axis of 5.13 AU). Its orbit has an eccentricity of 0.05 and an inclination of 29° with respect to the ecliptic. The body's observation arc begins with its official discovery observation at Uccle in September 1950.

Asteroid pair 

In 1993, Andrea Milani suggested that Antilochus  forms an asteroid pair with 3801 Thrasymedes, using the hierarchical clustering method (HCM), which looks for groupings of neighboring asteroids based on the smallest distances between them in the proper orbital element space. 
The astronomer describes the finding as statistically significant though difficult to account for by a regular collisional event. The Antilochus–Thrasymedes pair is not listed at the Johnston's archive.

Naming 

This minor planet was named after prince Antilochus from Greek mythology. He was the youngest son of King Nestor, close friend of Greek hero Achilles and commander of the Greek contingent of the Pylians during the Trojan War. The official  was published by the Minor Planet Center in May 1952.

Physical characteristics 

In the Tholen, Barucci and Tesco classification, Antilochus is a dark D-type asteroid, with a V–I color index of 0.95. The D-type is the most common spectral type among the Jupiter trojans.

Rotation period 

In December 2009 and June 2016, rotational lightcurves of Antilochus were obtained from photometric observations by American astronomer Robert Stephens at the Santana Observatory  and at the Center for Solar System Studies (CS3) in California. Lightcurve analysis gave a rotation period of 31.52 and 31.54 hours with an amplitude of 0.09 and 0.11 magnitude, respectively. Follow-up observations over a total of 11 nights by Stephens in August 2017 gave the so-far best-rated lightcurve with a period of  hours – which corresponds to half the period solution of the former results – and a slightly higher brightness variation of 0.12 magnitude.

Stephen's period determination supersedes previously reported results by Vincenzo Zappalà (1985; 12 h), Federico Manzini (2007; 12 h) and René Roy (2009; 22.5 h).

Diameter and albedo 

According to the surveys carried out by the Infrared Astronomical Satellite IRAS, the Japanese Akari satellite, and NASA's Wide-field Infrared Survey Explorer with its subsequent NEOWISE mission, Antilochus measures between 101.62 and 111.69 kilometers in diameter and its surface has an albedo between 0.053 and 0.063. The Collaborative Asteroid Lightcurve Link adopts the results obtained by IRAS, that is, an albedo of 0.0633 and a diameter of 101.62 kilometers, with Pravec's revised absolute magnitude of 8.59.

Notes

References

External links 
 Query: D-type asteroid in the SBDB, Jet Propulsion Laboratory
 Asteroid Lightcurve Database (LCDB), query form (info )
 Dictionary of Minor Planet Names, Google books
 Asteroids and comets rotation curves, CdR – Observatoire de Genève, Raoul Behrend
 Discovery Circumstances: Numbered Minor Planets (1)-(5000) – Minor Planet Center
 
 

001583
Discoveries by Sylvain Arend
Named minor planets
001583
19500919